Skysuites @ Anson, is one of the tallest skyscrapers in Singapore and tied for the tallest residential building with Altez. The building sits at the city centre of Tanjong Pagar.

Background 
Construction started in 2010 and ended in 2014. The structure is primarily made from poured concrete and steel. The building is 250 m (820 ft) tall and is 2,788.1 m2 (30,011 sq ft). It is tied for the 7th tallest building in Singapore. The building is primarily a condominium with restaurants scattered throughout the complex. The suites are very luxurious and even a small unit can cost millions. The leasehold of the condominium is 99-years.

See also 

 List of tallest buildings in Singapore
 List of tallest freestanding steel structures
 List of buildings

References

External links 
 Official website
 Emporis – Building ID #1210020
 Skysuites @ Anson Official Brochure.pdf

2014 establishments in Singapore
Residential buildings in Singapore
Skyscrapers in Singapore
Residential buildings completed in 2014